Terrestrial flies are a broad group of artificial flies used by fly anglers to imitate terrestrial insects that fall prey to fish in rivers, streams and lakes.  Most typical are patterns imitating grasshoppers, crickets, ants, beetles, leaf hoppers, cicadas and moths.

History
Terrestrial fly patterns as a class of artificial was developed in earnest in the 1950s with the publication of Vincent C. Marinaro's A Modern Dry Fly Code-The Classic and Revolutionary Book on Dry-Fly Fishing with Aquatic and Terrestrial Artificials (1950).  In the early centuries of fly fishing, fly anglers certainly attempted to replicate just about any type of live bait used for fishing.  Some of these flies were undoubtably replicating terrestrial insects. The Palmer Worm of the 17th century was a heavily hackled fly that resembled a common fuzzy caterpiller, yet as Andrew Herd in The Fly-Two Thousand Years of Fly Fishing (2003) relates, palmer worms were never found in or on the water.

General description
Most terrestrial patterns are designed to float and are fished as dry flies.  They replicate a terrestrial insect that is either blown on to the water surface or falls into the water from bankside vegetation.  Exceptions are patterns replicating ants may be designed to sink as when ants drown, they sink.  Early terrestrial patterns relied on hair, fur, hackle and other feathers to craft the fly.  Modern terrestrial patterns rely heavily on foam, rubber and other synthetic materials.

List of Terrestrial patterns

Hoppers

Crickets

Ants
As described in Trout Flies-A Tier's Reference (1999), Dave Hughes

Beetles

Leaf Hoppers
As described in A Modern Dry-Fly Code (1950), Vincent C. Marinaro
 Jassid

Moths
As described in Fly Patterns-Tie Thousands of Flies (2008), Randall and Mary Kaufmann
 Hoolet Moth
As Described in Yellowstone Country Flies-The Fly Patterns of Parks' Fly Shop (2013), Walter Wiese
 Korn's Spent Spruce Moth

Cicadas
As described in Fly Patterns-Tie Thousands of Flies (2008), Randall and Mary Kaufmann

Notes

Dry fly patterns